Van Nostrand is a Dutch surname. Notable people with the surname include:

Amy Van Nostrand (born 1953), American actress
Burr Van Nostrand, American composer (born 1945)
David Van Nostrand (1811–1886), American publisher
John Van Nostrand (1961–1984), American tennis player
Kevin VanNostrand (born 1987), American kickboxer
Molly Van Nostrand (born 1965), American tennis player
Wally Van (born Charles Wallace Van Nostrand; 1880-1974), American actor and director

See also
Van Nostrand's Scientific Encyclopedia, 1938 encyclopedia of science
The Van Nostrand Tiara, 1913 silent film
 Van Nostrand Reinhold, an American publisher acquired by John Wiley & Son
 A frequently used alias by the character Cosmo Kramer in the American sitcom Seinfeld.

Surnames of Dutch origin